Salisbury Garden is a public space between the Hong Kong Museum of Art and Hong Kong Space Museum, along Salisbury Road in Tsim Sha Tsui, Kowloon. At the centre is a fountain, with patches of trees on two sides to provide shades for pedestrians.

The Art Square at Salisbury Garden opened in 2014.

References

External links
 

Urban public parks and gardens in Hong Kong
Tsim Sha Tsui